Mnason of Phocis was the son of Mnaseas, who took command of the Phokian army after the death of Phayllus.   Mnason was a student of Aristotle.  Mnason was infamous for the large number of slaves he kept.

There is an apocryphal story Aristotle aggressively questioning Plato in his old age, at which of Mnason is mentioned as being in attendance.

References
 Aelian, Varia Historia 3.19.
 Aristotle, Politics, 5.4.
 Athenaeus, Book VI, 264c
 Diod. xvi. 38.

Ancient Phocian generals